Lviv Oblast Football Federation (LOFF) is a football governing body in the region of Lviv Oblast, Ukraine. The federation is a member of the Regional Council of FFU and the collective member of the FFU itself.

History

The Ukrainian sports movement arose in West Ukraine / East Galicia just before the World War I on initiative of professor Ivan Bobersky around 1906. After the war in the recovered Poland, those competitions were conducted under auspices of the Ukrainian Sports Union (Ukrajinskyj Sojuz Sportowyj). However those competitions were not popular and many leading Ukrainian football clubs such as Ukraina Lwow eventually joined the official Polish competitions.

The well organized and publicized Ukrainian football competitions in the region started during World War II as Soviet football competitions in 1940 when the West Ukraine was occupied by the Soviet Red Army (RKKA). All of the original football clubs were dissolved and in their place were created generic Soviet clubs ("proletarian" background) such as Dynamo, Spartak, DO (Dom Ofitserov), and others. During the Nazi occupation in 1941-1944, there was conducted the championship of Halychyna among Ukrainian squads in 1942-44. 

After the war, the Soviet football championship of Lviv Oblast within the Soviet Ukraine was reinstated. With fall of the Soviet Union in 1989-91, the competitions phased over as part of independent Ukraine.

Previous champions

1940    Dynamo Lviv
1941-1944 World War II
1945    Dynamo Lviv (2)
1946-1947 no competitions
1948    Spartak Yavoriv
1949    Kharchovyk Vynnyky
1950    DOK Lviv (res)
1951    Kolhospnyk Bibrka
1952    Iskra Zolochiv
1953    Dynamo Lviv (3)
1954    Kolhospnyk Bibrka (2)
1955    Burevisnyk Zolochiv
1956    Burevisnyk Zolochiv (2)
1957    ???
1958    Avanhard Nesteriv
1959    Spartak Drohobych
1960    Avanhard Vynnyky
1961    Silmash Lviv
1962    Silmash Lviv (2)
1963    LVVPU Lviv
1964    ???
1965    Khimik Novyi Rozdil
1966    Sokil Lviv
1967    Shakhtar Chervonohrad
1968    Khimik Novyi Rozdil (2)
1969    Khimik Novyi Rozdil (3)
1970    Sokil Lviv (2)
1971    Sokil Lviv (3)
1972    Avanhard Stryi
1973    Sokil Lviv (4)
1974    SKA Lviv (2)
1975    SKA Lviv (3)
1976    SKA Lviv (4)
1977    Shakhtar Chervonohrad (2)
1978    ???
1979    Shakhtar Chervonohrad (3)
1980    Khimik Drohobych
1981    Khimik Drohobych (2)
1982    Spartak Sambir
1983    Tsementnyk Mykolaiv
1984    Spartak Sambir (2)
1985    Spartak Sambir (3)
1986    Tsementnyk Mykolaiv (2)
1987    Avanhard Zhydachiv
1988    Spartak Sambir (4)
1989    Karpaty Kamianka-Buzka
1990    Hazovyk Komarno
1991    Hirnyk Novoyavorivske
1992sp  Tsementnyk Mykolaiv (3)
1993    Karpaty Kamianka-Buzka/FC Lviv
1994    Haray Zhovkva/Haray Zhovkva
1995    Yavir Yavoriv/Yavir Yavoriv
1996    Yavir Yavoriv (2)/Yavir Yavoriv
1997    Yavir Yavoriv (3)/Yavir Yavoriv
1998    Yavir Yavoriv (4)/Yavir Yavoriv
1999    SC Truskavets
1999fl  Naftovyk Boryslav
2000    Rochyn Sosnivka
2001    Rochyn Sosnivka (2)
2002    Rava Rava-Ruska
2003    Rava-2 Rava Ruska (2)
2004    Karpaty Truskavets
2005    Karpaty Kamianka-Buzka (2)
2006    Shakhtar Chervonohrad (4)
2007    Rava Rava-Ruska (3)
2008    Rava Rava-Ruska (4)
2009    Karpaty Kamianka-Buzka (3)
2010    Naftusia Skhidnytsia
2011    FC Kulykiv
2012    Rukh Vynnyky
2013    Rukh Vynnyky (2)
2014    Rukh Vynnyky (3)
2015    Rukh Vynnyky (4)
2016    SCC Demnya
2017    FC Mykolaiv (4)
2018    Yunist Verkhnya Bilka
2019    Yunist Verkhnya Bilka (2)
2020    Yunist Verkhnya Bilka (3)
2021    

Note: 
 In 1993–99 the championship was organized by fall-spring calendar. In 1999 the main competition was shifted back to the summer calendar. Therefore, there are two champions in 1999.
 In 1992 Tsementnyk became a champion including performance records of first and youth reserve teams, so called "combined record".
 In 1993–1998 there existed playoffs for "absolute champion" between champions of oblast and city. In the table the "absolute" champion is placed second after the oblast champion.

Winners
 4 - 7 clubs (Sokil, SKA, Spartak S., Yavir, Shakhtar Ch., Rava, Rukh, Mykolaiv)
 3 - 3 clubs (Dynamo, Khimik N.R., Karpaty K.B.)
 2 - 6 clubs (Kolhospnyk, Burevisnyk, Silmash, Khimik Dr., Rochyn, Yunist)
 1 - 19 clubs

Football championship of Drohobych Oblast
In 1945–1958 there was conducted separate football championship in Drohobych Oblast which later was merged with Lviv Oblast.

Football championship of Halychyna
The competitions were conducted during the occupation by the Nazi Germany within the General Government in 1942-1944 under auspices of the Ukrainian Central Committee from Krakow. The competitions were officially known as the Professor Volodymyr Kubiyovych Cup.
 1942 – Ukraina Lwow
 1943 – Skala Stryi
 1944 – Vatra Drohobych (season unfinished)

Professional clubs
 FC Spartak Lviv, 1946-1949
 SKA Lviv (ODO, SKVO, SC Lutsk, SKA Karpaty), 1949, 1954-1989
 FC Karpaty Lviv, 1963-1981, 1989-2021, 2021-

 FC Lviv (FC Hazovyk Komarne 1992-2001, Hazovyk-Skala Stryi 2001-2006), 1992-2012, 2017-

 SC Skify Lviv, 1994-1996 (two seasons)
 FC Dynamo Lviv, 1999-2002
 FC SKA-Orbita Lviv, 2001-2002 (single season)
 FC Rukh Lviv (until 2019 represented Vynnyky), 2016-

Non-Lviv city professional clubs
 FC Spartak Drohobych (representing Drohobych Oblast), 1946 (single season)
 FC Neftianik Drohobych, 1960-1970
 FC Shakhter Chervonohrad, 1968-1970
 FC Halychyna Drohobych, 1990-2003
 FC Skala Stryi (Karpaty Kamianka-Buzka), 1991-1996
 FC Sambir (Promin Volia Baranetska), 1992-1994
 FC Avanhard Zhydachiv, 1992-1996
 FC Medyk Morshyn, 1993-1994 (single season)
 FC Haray Zhovkva, 1995-1999
 FC Mykolaiv (Tsementnyk-Khorda), 1997-2002
 FC Sokil Zolochiv, 2000-2002 (two seasons)
 FC Rava Rava-Ruska, 2003-2006
 FC Skala Stryi (2004) (until 2011 represented Morshyn, FC Morshyn, Skala Morshyn), 2009-2018

Derbies

Lviv football derby at professional level started with creation of the Polish league "Ekstraklasa" in 1927 when three Lviv teams became founding members of the league including one of the first Polish champions Pogoń Lwów. The focal Lviv derby before the World War II was between Pogoń Lwów and Czarni Lwów which lasted from 1927 to 1933 when Czarni were relegated.
 Pogoń – Czarni (3:0/1:3, 4:0/1:1, 2:0/2:1, 0:0/0:1, 2:1/1:1)
 Pogoń – Hasmonea (1:2/2:2, 2:0/3:0)

The first meeting between two Lviv city teams at Soviet professional level (tier 2) took place in 1949 between Spartak and ODO (SKA). During the Soviet period those teams met only twice and all in one season. Later however more lasting derby existed between SKA and Karpaty that also played at tier 2.

See also
 Lviv Oblast football team
 FFU Council of Regions

Notes

References

External links
 Federation website. Lviv Oblast Football Federation
 Lviv Oblast championship at footballfacts.ru
 Призери чемпіонату Львівщини: сезони 1992-2019. ffl.org.ua. 9 July 2020

Football in the regions of Ukraine
Football governing bodies in Ukraine
Sport in Lviv Oblast